Stadion v Městských sadech is a football stadium in Opava, Czech Republic. It is the home stadium of SFC Opava and has a capacity of 7,758 seated places. It is located in the municipal park near the Opava River.

References

External links
 Stadium information

Football venues in the Czech Republic
SFC Opava
Sports venues in the Moravian-Silesian Region
Sports venues completed in 1973
Sport in Opava
Buildings and structures in Opava
1973 establishments in Czechoslovakia
20th-century architecture in the Czech Republic